Mount Washington is a deeply eroded volcano in the Cascade Range of Oregon. It lies within Deschutes and Linn counties and is surrounded by the Mount Washington Wilderness area.

Like the rest of the Oregon Cascades, Mount Washington was produced by the subduction of the oceanic Juan de Fuca tectonic plate under the continental North American tectonic plate, forming during the late Pleistocene. Made mostly of mafic (rich in magnesium and iron) volcanic rock like subalkaline basalt and basaltic andesite, it has a volcanic plug occupying its summit cone and numerous dikes. It is surrounded by other volcanic features such as cinder cones and spatter cones. The volcano's last eruptions took place from spatter cones about 1,350 years ago, generating basaltic andesite lava deposits.

Mount Washington has barren surroundings, which have seen little historical recreational use. A wagon road at McKenzie Pass was built in 1872, which was later paved during the 1930s. On August 26, 1923, the mountain was first ascended by six boys from the neighboring city of Bend. The surrounding area was designated the Mount Washington Wilderness by the federal government in 1964. The wilderness area is not heavily used, though it has a number of hiking trails. Wildlife is sparse in the region. Vegetation is mostly limited to pines and shrubs. Animal life includes deer, American black bear, cougar, various small animal species, and some fish species in the lakes.

Geography 

Despite being one of the smaller volcanic peaks in the Oregon Cascades, Mount Washington is the most prominent landmark between North Sister and Three Fingered Jack, with the Cache Mountain cinder cones to the northeast and Hayrick Butte and Hoodoo Butte to the northwest. The volcano forms a crest of steep, icy mountains with North Cinder Peak and Three Fingered Jack to the south of Mount Jefferson. The volcano has a pinnacle appearance resembling the spire-like shape of Mount Thielsen. According to Harris (2005), the volcano resembles Cleopatra's Needle from certain angles and the Sugarloaf Mountain in Brazil from others.

Physical geography 

Most precipitation falls during the winter as snow, and summers are warm and dry. During the winter season, the Cascades are covered with thick snow. As a result, Oregon Route 242 over McKenzie Pass becomes impassable from fall through late spring, while the Santiam Highway and Oregon Route 126 are maintained and remain open.

Within the Mount Washington Wilderness, there are outwash plains and lateral, recessional, and terminal ground moraines. Many of these glacial deposits were created during the most recent glacial advance in the late Pleistocene, though there are Holocene glacial deposits as well. There was an ice sheet during the late Pleistocene between Mount Washington and Three Fingered Jack. The McKenzie River, fed by Clear Lake, runs south for about  just west of Mount Washington before it turns west for another  and meets the Willamette River near the city of Eugene.

Wilderness

First named a wild area by the United States Forest Service in 1975, it was designated as one of the original wilderness areas under the 1964 Wilderness Act. Located  to the west of Bend, the Mount Washington plot is the smallest of three wilderness areas that encompass most of the High Cascades, a physiographic region located in the central part of Oregon; the two others are the Three Sisters Wilderness and Mount Jefferson Wilderness. Other major features include Belknap Crater and 28 lakes. The wilderness area is jointly administered by authorities for the Willamette National Forest and Deschutes National Forest.

Mineral and geothermal potential 

A mineral survey from 1980 through 1981 detected little potential for metallic mineral or fossil fuel resources in the Mount Washington Wilderness. The area contains large amounts of cinder – more than  – but there are alternate sources in the region, which are sufficient to meet local demands. The volcanic vents throughout the Mount Washington Wilderness are underlain by Eocene to Pliocene volcanic rock layers, which do not contain hydrocarbons for fossil fuels. While there is relatively little potential for geothermal energy in the High Cascades, there are hot springs along the western edge of the mountain range.

Ecology 

Described by Wuerthner (2003) as a "rocks and ice wilderness," much of the Mount Washington Wilderness consists of lava flows and rubble. However, it does include some forested areas, as well as 28 lakes in the northern and southwestern parts of the space. Vegetation in the area includes mountain hemlock, lodgepole pine, ponderosa pine, and whitebark pine. Ponderosa pine occurs at the eastern base of the volcano, with Douglas fir on the western side. Vegetation is sparse on lava-covered surfaces. Mountain hemlock, however, also grows on lava flows, and there is an understory of beargrass, huckleberry, and rhododendron. Animal life includes large animals such as deer and elk, with the rare American black bear or cougar. Smaller animals like pikas, marmots, martens, snowshoe hares, and ground squirrels are also found in the area. Lakes in the wilderness sustain populations of brook trout, cutthroat trout, and rainbow trout, and frogs can be observed around some of them.

Human history 

The barrenness of Mount Washington's surroundings means that it has seen little historical recreational use. A wagon road at McKenzie Pass was built in 1872, which was later paved during the 1930s and became Oregon Route 242. It received its name from the nearby McKenzie River, which in turn derived its name from Donald McKenzie, a fur trader who explored the area in 1812. On August 26, 1923, Mount Washington was climbed for the first time by six boys from Bend: Ervin McNeal, Phil Philbrook, Armin Furrer, Wilbur Watkins, Leo Harryman, and Ronald Sellars.

Before Mount Washington's surroundings were designated a wilderness area in 1964, the Willamette National Forest administration had planned to open them to commercial timber production to address a shortage in Lane County, asserting that the land had little aesthetic or recreational merit. The area was established anyway, as Forest Service agents argued it would improve "wilderness".

Geology 

Volcanism in the Oregon segment of the Cascade Range results from intra-range rifts and the subduction of the Juan de Fuca tectonic plate under the North American tectonic plate. Mount Washington forms part of the High Cascades physiographic region in central Oregon, an arc of Pliocene to Quaternary lava flows, cinder cones, and fissure vents that trend from north to south, with occasional large stratovolcanoes. Near Mount Washington, the High Cascades form a lava field with high-alumina, diktytaxitic basalt erupted from cinder cones. These volcanoes have been eroded by glaciers and reduced to buttes in the Cascade arc, and much of the vents in the area were covered by Mount Washington.

Washington is part of the informal group of volcanoes known as Oregon's Matterhorns, which includes Mount Thielsen, Three Fingered Jack, Mount Bailey, and Diamond Peak. The name originates from the spire-like appearance of the volcanoes' summits, which resembles the pinnacle of the Matterhorn in Switzerland. They all ceased eruptive activity at least 100,000 to 250,000 years ago, leading to their extensive dissection by glaciers over time. Washington represents one of 30 mafic (rich in magnesium and iron) stratovolcanoes and shield volcanoes in the group, which include Pleistocene and Holocene eruptive centers. Volcanic rocks contained within the wilderness area are either composed of older basalt or younger basaltic andesite, all of which were produced during the Quaternary, probably during the past 700,000 years. Pleistocene deposits show evidence of erosion by glaciers. Holocene deposits, dated between 3,000 and 1,500 years old, encompass about half of the wilderness area, and they also occur outside the wilderness area at its northwestern and southern borders.

Whether Mount Washington is a stratovolcano or shield volcano is debated within the literature. Wood and Kienle (1990) refer to it as a "mafic shield volcano," and the Global Volcanism Program of the Smithsonian Institution also considers it a shield volcano with a pyroclastic cone. Sherrod et al. (2004) classify Mount Washington as a "steep-sided" shield volcano. Hildreth (2007) likewise calls it a "a glacially sculpted mafic stratocone [...] with a broad apron of mafic lavas." However, Hildreth acknowledges that there is morphological continuity from steep mafic cones into transitional, cone-shaped shield volcanoes like Olallie Butte.

It has a summit cone, a volcanic plug comprised by cinder, lava flows, and intrusive rock that covers Washington's volcanic conduit. There are dikes exposed throughout the summit cone, mostly oriented from north to south, with another dike swarm trending north from the central plug. The summit formed over a platform of basaltic andesite lavas from early eruptions at Mount Washington, made of thinner flows combined with pyroclastic rock.

The volcano has a mafic composition, with subalkaline basalt and basaltic andesite. Lava flows from Washington exhibit breccia with plagioclase and olivine, with palagonite tuff at the northeastern slope of the mountain that might indicate a past subglacial eruption during Washington's cone-building phase.

Mount Washington has been eroded over time and is now very dissected, with its inner contents exposed and U-shaped canyons and cirques. The George Lake and Dry Creek cirques, which face north and northeast, respectively, show evidence of holding glaciers similar to those documented at Canyon Creek cirque on Three Fingered Jack with moraines.

Subfeatures 

The Global Volcanism Program considers Cache Mountain, Little Cache Mountain, Hayrick Butte, and Hoodoo Butte subsidiary cones of Mount Washington. Composed of gray to red cinder, they also have scoria and welded spatter. Major cinder cones in the wilderness include Belknap Crater, Twin Craters, Scott Mountain, and the Sand Mountain craters.

Eruptions from a chain of spatter cones mark the most recent activity at Mount Washington. About one mile in length, they trend northeast, with their mid-section parallel to depressions in the Cache Creek valley between Mount Washington and Blue Lake Crater. Farther south, there are seven other vents, including three small craters separated from three larger vents to the south by a graben, as well as a central crater with a small crater on the northern side of its rim.

Mount Washington basaltic andesite 

There are four major types of basalt and basaltic andesite in the central Cascades: early high-alumina olivine tholeiitic (HAOT) basalt, normal High Cascade HAOT basalt, North Sister basaltic andesites, and Mount Washington type basaltic andesites. Hughes (1990) argues that their differences could be the result of different magma sources or magma evolution in open systems. Mount Washington basaltic andesites are also considered one of the three distinct mafic rock types in the High Cascade platform, with North Sister basaltic andesites and normal basalts. The three groups all exhibit different major and trace element abundances. Mount Washington basaltic andesite is more common than North Sister basaltic andesite, with higher levels of incompatible elements and rare-earth elements. It also extends to the east and west of the major Cascade arc. Otherwise, the Mount Washington and North Sister basaltic andesites display lithologic similarities including a dearth of pyroxene phenocrysts and augite microphenocrysts, and both groups were probably near-primary melts. According to Hughes (1982), examples of Mount Washington basaltic andesites occur at Holocene deposits from Nash Crater, Four-in-One Cone, and Little Belknap Cone, as well as undated deposits at Todd Lake Volcano, Falls Creek, Broken Top, and the abutment of Tumalo Dam.

Eruptive history 

Mount Washington formed during the late Pleistocene epoch; the volcano itself is not older than a few hundred thousand years. Harris (2005) estimates that it has not erupted for more than 250,000 years, similar to Mount Thielsen; this date is supported by James, Manga, and Rose (1999). Paleomagnetic evidence suggests that the volcano and associated lava flows exhibit normal magnetic polarity. Its volcanic edifice was produced through the eruption of basaltic andesite and mafic volcanic ash, the latter being preserved as palagonite tuff along the northeastern and southwestern flanks of the summit cone.

Compared to larger stratovolcanoes in the Cascade volcanic arc, Mount Washington, like the rest of Oregon's Matterhorns, had a relatively short eruptive life. Several spatter cones produced basaltic andesite on the lower northeastern side of the volcano, following a fissure that reached  from Washington's summit. There were no lava flows from this eruption, nor at an eruption at the nearby Blue Lake Crater, which produced volcanic material that displayed petrographic similarities to the Mount Washington splatter cone deposits. These include similar porphyritic textures with 10 to 15 percent plagioclase phenocrysts as well as similar alignments, suggesting that they erupted simultaneously. Sherrod et al. (2004) argue that the spatter cones and activity from Blue Lake Crater represent the most recent eruptions near the McKenzie Pass and Santiam Pass region.

It is still possible that new volcanic cones could be produced at the base of Mount Washington. However, according to Taylor, Causey, and MacLeod (1983), the volcano itself is unlikely to still be active.

Recreation 

While the area is not used as frequently as many other wilderness areas in the Oregon branch of the Cascade Range, it offers scenic lakes and trails. The Pacific Crest Trail passes over the western side of Mount Washington. Other trails include a loop around the Patjens Lakes, the Hand Lake trail, and the Benson Lake route. The U.S. National Geodetic Survey Data Sheet for Mount Washington notes that climbing the volcano is challenging and dangerous and thus is not recommended for inexperienced climbers or climbers without proper equipment.

Notes 
 [a]  According to Hildreth's definitions, proximal relief refers to the difference between the summit elevation and the highest exposure of old rocks under the main edifice, while draping relief marks the difference between the summit elevation and the edifice's lowest distal lava flows (excluding pyroclastic and debris flows).

References

Sources 

 .
 
 .
 
 
 
 
 
 
 
 
 
 .
 .
 .
 
 .
 .

External links 
 

Cascade Range
Cascade Volcanoes
Deschutes National Forest
Landmarks in Oregon
Mountains of Deschutes County, Oregon
Mountains of Linn County, Oregon
Mountains of Oregon
Pleistocene shield volcanoes
Polygenetic shield volcanoes
Shield volcanoes of the United States
Subduction volcanoes
Volcanic plugs of the United States
Volcanoes of Deschutes County, Oregon
Volcanoes of Linn County, Oregon
Volcanoes of Oregon
Willamette National Forest